Sérgio Avelino Lopes (born 2 June 1983) is an Angolan handball player for Association Sportive d'Hammamet and the Angolan national team.

He participated at the 2017 World Men's Handball Championship.

In 2017, he signed a one-year deal with Tunisian side Association Sportive d'Hammamet.

References

1983 births
Living people
Angolan male handball players
African Games silver medalists for Angola
African Games medalists in handball
Competitors at the 2011 All-Africa Games
Competitors at the 2015 African Games